Senate Grove is an extinct town in Franklin County, in the U.S. state of Missouri.

A post office called Senate Grove was established in 1891, and remained in operation until 1903. The community took its name from a nearby Methodist church of the same name.

References

Ghost towns in Missouri
Former populated places in Franklin County, Missouri